Nathan Olmsted (October 17, 1812 – April 15, 1898) was an American lawyer and politician.

Born in Davenport, New York, Olmsted moved to Wisconsin Territory in 1838 and settled in Belmont, Wisconsin Territory. He was a lawyer and served as justice of the peace. Olmsted served in the Wisconsin State Assembly in 1851 and 1853. He died in Belmont, Wisconsin.

Notes 

1812 births
1898 deaths
People from Delaware County, New York
People from Belmont, Wisconsin
Wisconsin lawyers
Members of the Wisconsin State Assembly
19th-century American politicians
19th-century American lawyers